Hygieia is a goddess from Greek, as well as Roman, mythology (also referred to as: Hygiea or Hygeia; ;  or ,  or ). Hygieia is a goddess of health ( – hugieia), cleanliness and hygiene. Her name is the source for the word "hygiene".

Hygieia is related to the Greek god of medicine, Asclepius, who is the son of the Olympian god Apollo. Hygieia is most commonly referred to as a daughter of Asclepius and his wife Epione. Hygieia and her four sisters each performed a facet of Apollo's art: Hygieia (health, cleanliness, and sanitation); Panacea (universal remedy); Iaso (recuperation from illness); Aceso (the healing process); and Aegle (radiant good health).

The role of Hygieia in antiquity 
One notable reference regarding Hygieia's role as a goddess of health can be found within the Hippocratic oath. This oath is used by physicians in order to swear before various healing gods, one of which being Hygieia, that they would follow a code of established ethical standards of practice.

Section of the translated oath from Greek to English:

 I swear by Apollo Healer, by Asclepius, by Hygieia, by Panacea, and by all the gods and goddesses, making them my witnesses, that I will carry out, according to my ability and judgment, this oath and this indenture.

Hygieia and Asclepius 
The worship of Hygieia was closely associated with the cult of Asclepius. While Asclepius was more directly associated with healing, she was associated with the prevention of sickness and the continuation of good health. In the second century CE, the famous traveler Pausanias provided an account based on what he witnessed within the state of Greece. In his encyclopedic text Description of Greece, written circa 160 CE to 174 CE, Pausanias described encountering statues of Asclepius and Hygieia, located at Tegea.

In addition to statues which represent the two figures, the incorporation of Hygieia within the cult of Asclepius can also be seen in medical iconography on numerous ancient Graeco-Roman coins. The close association between Hygieia and Asclepius indicates the important place she held in the cult of Asclepius.

Worship

Hygieia's primary temples were in Epidaurus, Corinth, Cos and Pergamon. At the Asclepeion of Titane in Sicyon (founded by Alexanor, Asclepius' grandson), the Greek historian Pausanias remarked that a statue of Hygieia was covered by women's hair and pieces of Babylonian clothes. According to inscriptions, similar sacrifices such as this were offered at Paros.

Hygieia was also associated with the Greek goddess Athena. In the 2nd century AD, Pausanias noted statues both of Hygieia and of Athena Hygieia near the entrance to the Acropolis of Athens. "Athena Hygieia" was one of the cult titles given to Athena, as Plutarch recounts of the building of the Parthenon (447–432 BC):
However, the cult of Hygieia as an independent goddess did not begin to spread until the Delphic oracle recognized her, after the devastating Plague of Athens (430–427 BC), and in Rome after the 293 BC plague there.

The poet Ariphron, from the Greek city-state Sicyon, wrote a well-known hymn during the 4th century BC which celebrated Hygieia. Statues of Hygieia were created by Scopas, Bryaxis and Timotheus, among others, but there is no clear description of what they looked like. In the surviving depictions, she is often shown as a young woman feeding a large snake that was wrapped around her body or drinking from a jar that she carried. These attributes were later adopted by the Gallo-Roman healing goddess, Sirona.

Hygieia was modified by the Romans into the goddess Valetudo, the goddess of personal health. There exists some debate about whether Hygieia can also be identified with the Roman goddess of social welfare, Salus; however, this has yet to be fully substantiated.

Recent discoveries 
In August 2021, archaeologists from Dumlupınar University announced the discovery of statue of Hygieia in the Ancient Greek city Aizanoi. The human sized statue was portrayed with a snake in its arms. The statue was revealed inside the columned gallery throughout the south wing of the agora.

See also
 Bowl of Hygieia
 10 Hygiea, a main belt asteroid named after Hygieia
 College of Aesculapius and Hygia
 List of health deities
Ancient Greek Medicine
Pericles

References

Notes
 Smith, William; Dictionary of Greek and Roman Biography and Mythology, London (1873). "Hygieia".

External links 
 http://www.perseus.tufts.edu/hopper/text?doc=Perseus:text:1999.01.0160:book=2:chapter=11&highlight=health
 

Greek goddesses
Health goddesses
Children of Asclepius